Mustafa Arif Deymer (1874–1954) was a Turkish politician who served both the Ottoman government and the Turkish Republic. He served as the Ottoman interior minister from 1918 to 1919 and as minister of education in 1921. During the Turkish Republican era, he became governor of Kırklareli Province. He is also noted for providing important testimony in the aftermath of the Armenian genocide.

Life and career
Mustafa Arif was born in Thessaloniki, Greece in 1874. He studied civil service. He subsequently served as a civil servant in his hometown of Thessaloniki.

He was then appointed as the Ottoman interior minister from 1918 to 1919 after Talaat Pasha resigned from his post.

On 21 October 1920, Mustafa Arif Bey was appointed as the head of the Council of State. He served this post until 19 August 1921. Thereafter, in 1921, he became the minister of education.

In 1924, after the establishment of the Republic of Turkey, Mustafa Arif served on the commission board of the Turkish Red Crescent during negotiations over the population exchange between Greece and Turkey.

On 27 July 1930, Mustafa Arif Deymer became governor of Kırklareli province, and served this position until 13 April 1932.

Armenian genocide testimony
The Armenian genocide was the Ottoman government's systematic extermination of its minority Armenian subjects inside their historic homeland, which lies within the territory constituting the present-day Republic of Turkey. Mustafa Arif served as Interior Minister in 1918, succeeding Talat Pasha after the latter stepped down. Arif established a governmental commission that examined the period of the massacres. On March 18, 1919, the commission concluded that 800,000 Armenians had perished during these events. The figure became reputable after other Turkish historians such as Yusuf Hikmet Bayur used the figure in their research and writing.

Mustafa Arif testified as follows regarding the Armenian genocide:

He also stated: "The atrocities committed against the Armenians reduced our country to a gigantic slaughterhouse." Mustafa Arif concluded that "Nobody asserts that it did not happen", and that the responsibility for the massacres belonged solely to the government of the time.

See also
Witnesses and testimonies of the Armenian genocide

References

Politicians from Thessaloniki
1874 births
Witnesses of the Armenian genocide
1954 deaths
Political people from the Ottoman Empire
Turkish politicians